Jerry Stogsdill (born June 15, 1947) is an American politician. He has served as a Democratic member for the 21st district in the Kansas House of Representatives since 2017.

References

1947 births
Living people
Democratic Party members of the Kansas House of Representatives
21st-century American politicians
Politicians from Topeka, Kansas